The Lewiston/Auburn Nordiques were a Tier III Junior "A" ice hockey team from Lewiston, Maine. The team was a member of the North American 3 Hockey League (NA3HL) since 2016 and played home games at the Androscoggin Bank Colisée since 2015. The franchise relocated several times under the operation of the Fighting Spirit organization before it was sold to the Colisée owner, Jim Cain, in 2017.

History
The team was founded in 2012 as the Lake George Fighting Spirit playing out of Lake George, New York. The Fighting Spirit joined the Northern States Hockey League (NSHL) as one of the seven inaugural teams.

The Fighting Spirit won the inaugural NSHL regular season championship with a record of 37–4–1. With the title, the Fighting Spirit received an automatic bid, with the second place Syracuse Stampede, to the Amateur Athletic Union (AAU) United Hockey Union tournament in Las Vegas, Nevada. The tournament included the top teams from the three AAU-sanctioned leagues: the NSHL, Western States Hockey League, and the Midwest Junior Hockey League.

Prior to the 2013–14 season, the team moved to Waterville Valley, New Hampshire, and were known as the AHI Fighting Spirit to reflect a partnership with the American Hockey Institute. The Fighting Spirit captured the team's second straight NSHL regular season title with a record of 31–4–3–2. After falling in the playoffs and participating in the second UHU National Championship in Las Vegas, the team announced a move to Laconia, New Hampshire, and would change their name to the New Hampshire Fighting Spirit for the 2014–15 season. During the 2014–15 season, the NSHL changed its name to the North American 3 Eastern Hockey League (NA3EHL) when operations were taken over by the Tier II North American Hockey League. During this time, the organization left the AAU and petitioned for approval into USA Hockey sanctioning, which was given prior to the 2015–16 season.

Prior to the 2015–16 season, the Fighting Spirit relocated again to Lewiston, Maine, and was called the L/A Fighting Spirit (with the L/A standing for Lewiston/Auburn) and began playing home games at Androscoggin Bank Colisée. Prior to the 2016–17 season, the Fighting Spirit became part of the North American 3 Hockey League (NA3HL) when it absorbed the NA3EHL.

In March 2017, it was announced that Fighting Spirit owner and head coach Rod Simmons had sold the team to the owner of the Androscoggin Bank Colisée, Jim Cain. Cain announced that beginning with the 2017–18 season, the team would rebrand as the Lewiston/Auburn Nordiques after the former professional team, the Maine Nordiques. With Simmons also stepping down from his coaching position, assistant coach Cam Robichaud was retained and promoted to head coach.

In 2019, a Tier II North American Hockey League (NAHL) added an expansion team called the Maine Nordiques under separate ownership. Head coach Robichaud then became an assistant for the NAHL team and the NA3HL Nordiques named Chris Pomerleau as head coach. In March 2020, Maine Nordiques' owner Darryl Antonacci agreed to purchase the Colisée and the Tier III Nordiques from Jim Cain. As part of the turnover, Antonacci folded the Tier III junior team and replaced it with Tier 1 youth teams. Simultaneously, the NA3HL cancelled their 2020 playoffs due to the COVID-19 pandemic and the L/A Nordiques ceased operations.

Statistics

Season records

United Hockey Union Nationals
In 2013 and 2014, the AAU held its own Junior A National Championship tournaments with the Midwest Junior Hockey League (MWJHL), Northern States Junior Hockey League (NSHL), and Western States Hockey League (WSHL) advanced two teams each.

References

External links
 Team website

Ice hockey teams in Maine
Ice hockey clubs established in 2017
2017 establishments in Maine
Sports in Lewiston, Maine